= Th'frvnchmvn =

TH'FRVNCHMVN
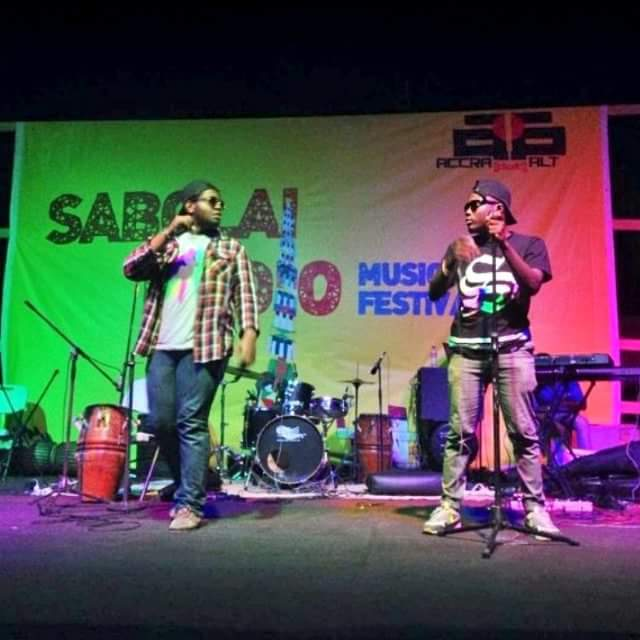
- Performing at Sabolai Radio in 2015

Background information
- Origin: Accra, Ghana
- Genres: Rap
- Years active: 2015–2017
- Label: Villa Direct
- Past members: Denny; N.O; MARS; Nelson The Poet

TH'FRVNCHMVN (pronounced The Frenchmen) was a rap/spoken word band from Accra, Ghana made up of N.O, Denny, MARS and Nelson. The band was the first of its kind from Africa.

== History ==
=== 2014 - Formation ===
In a radio interview, the band stated that they came together due to their failure to reach the top as solo artists during their time in senior high school under their own label; AGE. AGE disbanded and Villa Direct was created. Their style of rap and taste for sample filled beats make them unique. The band does not seem to be making music from one particular genre; they sound very experimental, fusing and exploring a lot of genres.

=== 2015 - 2.0 ===
On 31 January 2015, the band released its debut project, 2.0 which signifies a second step from their first. Their story lines on the album which discuss politics, human rights and wayward youth of today, are topics which most of their fans relate to.

=== 2016 - KAII ===
The band announced on their Twitter that they will be releasing an EP titled KAII later that year.

== Discography ==
- 2.0
